Margot Leicester (born September 1949) is a British actress.  She has appeared in King Charles III (2017) as Camilla and was nominated for an Olivier Award for Best Actress in 1995 for Broken Glass. She is also notable for television work such as Families, The Take and Five Days.

Personal life
She is married to the director David Thacker. The couple lives with their four children in London.

Filmography

Film

Television

Theatre

References

External links

British film actresses
Living people
British television actresses
1949 births
British republicans